Anderson Barn, near Hitchcock in Beadle County, South Dakota, is a barn built in 1885 by Bengt Anderson.  It was listed on the National Register of Historic Places in 2003.

It was built to house livestock and horses.  It is notable as an example of a feeder barn.

It has a gable roof with asphalt shingles as of 2003, over sides covered mostly by tongue and groove wood siding, on a poured concrete foundation.  Its north side has  doors on tracks.  In 2003 its interior featured a  manger, and was mostly unchanged except it had a poured concrete floor.  Its loft can store  of hay.

References

Barns on the National Register of Historic Places in South Dakota
Infrastructure completed in 1885
Buildings and structures in Beadle County, South Dakota
Barns in South Dakota
National Register of Historic Places in Beadle County, South Dakota